is an Apollo asteroid about 11 meters in diameter that makes close approaches to Earth. It orbits the Sun every  583.2 days,  in an ellipse between 0.749 AU  and 1.983 AU from the Sun. It was discovered on March 24, 2012 by the Catalina Sky Survey.

It came within  of Earth on March 26, 2012. The asteroid is about 7–15 meters in diameter.

The size of the asteroid is estimated from the absolute magnitude.

See also 
 2012 FN
List of asteroid close approaches to Earth in 2012

References

External links 
 
 
 

Minor planet object articles (unnumbered)
20120324